Vaudey may refer to:

Elisabeth de Vaudey (1773–1833), famous for her affair with French Emperor Napoleon I
Muriel Vaudey (born 1976), French ski mountaineer
Vaudey Abbey, English Cistercian abbey
Vellexon-Queutrey-et-Vaudey, commune in the Haute-Saône department in the region of Franche-Comté in eastern France
Villers-Vaudey, commune in the Haute-Saône department in the region of Franche-Comté in eastern France